Zhemchuzhina means pearl in Russian and may refer to
 Polina Zhemchuzhina (1897–1970), Soviet politician, wife of Vyacheslav Molotov
FC Zhemchuzhina Budyonnovsk, a Russian football club
FC Zhemchuzhina-Sochi, a Russian football club
FC Zhemchuzhina Yalta, a former Ukrainian football club